Harold Levitt (1921–2003) was an American architect.

Early life
Harold Warren Levitt was born on July 26, 1921, in San Francisco, California. He received a Bachelor of Arts in Graphic Arts from Stanford University and an architecture degree from the University of Southern California.

Career
He worked for Roland Coate and Burton Schutt before he founded his own architectural company, Levitt, LeDuc & Farwell, in the 1950s. The company was headquartered in Beverly Hills, California. He designed homes for Walter Mirisch, Steven Spielberg, Lew Wasserman, Olivia Newton-John, Ross Hunter, Quincy Jones, Burt Lancaster, Dean Martin, Debbie Reynolds, Lionel Richie, Kenny Rogers and Hal Wallis. He also designed the Riviera Hotel on the Las Vegas Strip and the headquarters of the Academy of Motion Picture Arts and Sciences in Beverly Hills.

Personal life
He was married to Jane (Spalding) Levitt for fifty-eight years, and they had a son, Lansford. He retired to Reno, Nevada, in 2001.

Death
He died at his holiday home in Las Vegas, Nevada, in 2003.

References

1921 births
2003 deaths
Architects from San Francisco
People from Beverly Hills, California
People from Las Vegas
People from Reno, Nevada
Stanford University alumni
USC School of Architecture alumni
20th-century American architects